The Thames Marine Mirage 29 is a British sailboat, that was first built in 1983 by Thames Marine of the United Kingdom. It is now out of production.

The Thames Marine Mirage 29 design is sometimes confused with a 1986 Canadian design, the Mirage Yachts-built Mirage 29.

Design
The Mirage 29 is a small recreational keelboat, built predominantly of fiberglass, with wood trim. It has a masthead sloop rig, an internally-mounted spade-type rudder and a fixed twin keel. It displaces .

The design has a PHRF racing average handicap of 177 with a high of 183 and low of 174.

See also
List of sailing boat types

Similar sailboats
Alberg 29
Bayfield 29 
C&C 29
Hunter 290
Mirage 29
Northwind 29
Prospect 900
Tanzer 29
Watkins 29

References

External links
Photo of a Thames Marine Mirage 29 on the water
Photo of a Thames Marine Mirage 29 in its cradle

Keelboats
1980s sailboat type designs
Sailing yachts
Sailboat types built by Thames Marine